Salah al-Din Road (also known as Salaheddin Road and the Salah ad-Deen Highway) is the main highway of the Gaza Strip. State of Palestine, and extends over 45 kilometers, spanning the entire length of the territory from the Rafah Crossing in the south to the Erez Crossing in the north. The road is named after the 12th-century Muslim general Salah al-Din.

History

The Salah al-Din Road is one of the oldest roads in the world. The armies of Ancient Egypt, Alexander the Great, the first Crusaders and Napoleon Bonaparte all traveled on it in their attempts to conquer the Levant. During at least the period of Ottoman Empire rule beginning in the early 16th century, the road extended south from al-Arish in Sinai to modern-day Turkey in the north. For centuries it was known as the "Way of the Philistines" and linked Egypt to present-day Lebanon, Syria, Turkey and beyond. After gaining control over Palestine following World War I, the British constructed a railroad running adjacently parallel to the Salah ad-Din Road for efficient supply and weapons transport.

According to historian Gerald Butt, "The whole focus of life" in Gaza City was directly related to the road which "gave the city its raison d'être." However, since the establishment of Israel in 1948 and the ongoing Arab–Israeli conflict, its former role as a major link between Egypt and Syria has diminished.

During Israel's occupation of the Gaza Strip between 1967 and 2005, large parts of the Salah al-Din Road were closed to Palestinian traffic and designated as parts of Israel's Highway 4, and there were 12 checkpoints manned by the Israeli Army. During the Second Intifada the road was also closed to Israeli traffic, except for small parts of it. Since Hamas assumed control of the territory after the 2007 Battle of Gaza with Fatah, they now control those checkpoints.

The Hamas Government has since widened and improved the road with funds coming from their tunnel industry revenues. In 2010 The National wrote of the Salah al-Din Road "Now, toiling farmers, tinkering mechanics and an array of colourful roadside businesses span the length of Salah al Din, from central to southern Gaza. Camels weave aimlessly between its lanes, workers dig for gravel at its edges, and teetering, horn-blaring lorries run up and down the road to ferry smuggled goods and aid assistance to Gaza's 1.5 million people ..."

References

Ancient roads and tracks
Streets in Gaza City